Michael Amir Murillo Bermudez (born 11 February 1996) is a Panamanian professional footballer who plays as a right-back for Belgian Pro League club Anderlecht and the Panama national team.

Club career

San Francisco
Born in Panama City, Murillo graduated from San Francisco's youth setup, and made his senior debut in the 2014–15 campaign, aged only 18. He quickly established himself as a first team regular and had his best season in 2015–16 in which he made 21 league appearances and scored 3 goals. On 25 October 2015, Murillo scored his first two goals for Los Monjes in a 2–1 victory over Alianza.

On 10 December 2015, Murillo played the entire match for San Francisco in the first edition of the Copa Panamá, as his side won the final against Chepo 5–4 on penalties, as the match finished 0–0 after extra time, to win their first title. On 26 August 2015, Murillo helped San Francisco to a famous 2–1 victory over Mexican side Querétaro FC in a 2015–16 CONCACAF Champions League match.

New York Red Bulls
On 18 February 2017 it was announced that Murillo was joining New York Red Bulls on a season long loan. On 29 July 2017 Murillo scored his first goal for New York in a 4–0 rout over Montreal Impact.
On 22 October 2017 Murillo scored his second goal for New York in a 2–1 victory over rival D.C. United, in the last match played at RFK Stadium. The Red Bulls exercised their contract option to permanently sign him on 11 November 2017.

On 13 March 2018, Murillo assisted on two goals in New York's 3–1 victory over Club Tijuana in the CONCACAF Champions League, helping the club advance to semifinals of the Champions League for the first time. On 14 April 2018, Murillo scored his first goal of the season for New York in a 3–1 victory over Montreal Impact. He was also selected to participate for the New York Red Bulls in the MLS All-Star Game against Italy's Juventus on 1 August 2018 in the Mercedes-Benz Stadium in Atlanta, Georgia, US, making him the first Panamanian to participate in an MLS All-Star game.

During his time with the Red Bulls, Murillo totalled 80 appearances in all competitions, scoring four goals and providing eight assists.

Anderlecht
On 6 December 2019, the Red Bulls announced the transfer of Murillo to Belgian side R.S.C. Anderlecht. Murillo scored his first goal for his new club on February 23, 2020, during a 6-1 victory versus K.A.S. Eupen.

International career

Murillo was called up for the Panama national team, making his debut in 2016. On 27 April 2016, Murillo scored his first goal with Panama in a 2–1 victory over Martinique.

Murillo started three of Panama's ten CONCACAF Hexagonal matches in the final round of 2018 World Cup qualifying, helping Panama qualify for its first World Cup. In May 2018 he was named to Panama's final 23-man squad for the 2018 World Cup in Russia. Murillo was the starting right back in Panama's group stage losses to Belgium and England. He received a yellow card in each of the two matches, making him ineligible to play in the team's final group match against Tunisia.

Career statistics

Club

International

International goals
Scores and results list Panama's goal tally first (includes one unofficial goal).

Honours
San Francisco
Copa Panamá: 2015

New York Red Bulls
MLS Supporters' Shield: 2018

Individual
CONCACAF Champions League Best XI: 2018
MLS All-Star: 2018

References

External links
Soccerway profile

1996 births
Living people
Panamanian footballers
San Francisco F.C. players
New York Red Bulls players
New York Red Bulls II players
Liga Panameña de Fútbol players
Panama international footballers
2017 Copa Centroamericana players
2017 CONCACAF Gold Cup players
Panamanian expatriate footballers
Expatriate soccer players in the United States
Panamanian expatriate sportspeople in the United States
Association football fullbacks
Sportspeople from Panama City
Major League Soccer players
USL Championship players
2018 FIFA World Cup players
2019 CONCACAF Gold Cup players
2015 CONCACAF U-20 Championship players